Pseudorabdion is a genus of snakes of the family Colubridae.

Geographic range
Species in the genus Pseudorabdion are found in Southeast Asia.

Species
The following 15 species are recognized as being valid.
 Pseudorabdion albonuchalis (Günther, 1896)
 Pseudorabdion ater (Taylor, 1922)
 Pseudorabdion collaris (Mocquard, 1892)
 Pseudorabdion eiselti Inger & Leviton, 1961
 Pseudorabdion longiceps (Cantor, 1847)
 Pseudorabdion mcnamarae (Taylor, 1917)
 Pseudorabdion modiglianii Giu. Doria & Petri, 2010
 Pseudorabdion montanum Leviton & W.C. Brown, 1959
 Pseudorabdion oxycephalum (Günther, 1858)
 Pseudorabdion sarasinorum (F. Müller, 1895)
 Pseudorabdion saravacense (Shelford, 1901)
 Pseudorabdion sirambense Giu. Doria & Petri, 2010
 Pseudorabdion talonuran R.M. Brown, Leviton & Sison, 1999
 Pseudorabdion taylori Leviton & W.C. Brown, 1959
 Pseudorabdion torquatum A.M.C. Duméril, Bibron & A.H.A. Duméril, 1854

Nota bene: A binomial authority in parentheses indicates that the species was originally described in a genus other than Pseudorabdion.

References

Further reading
Boulenger GA (1894). Catalogue of the Snakes in the British Museum (Natural History). Volume II., Containing the Conclusion of the Colubridæ Aglyphæ. London: Trustees of the British Museum (Natural History). (Taylor and Francis, printers). xi + 382 pp. + Plates I-XX. (Genus "Pseudorhabdium [sic]", pp. 328–329; species P. longiceps, p. 329; species P. oxycephalum, pp. 329–330).
Jan G (1862). "Enumerazione sistematico delle specie d'ofidi del gruppo Calamaridae [= Systematic enumeration of the species of snakes of the Calamaridae group]". Archivo per la zoologia l'anatomia e la fisiologia, Genova 2: 1-76. (Pseudorabdion, new genus, p. 10). (in Italian).

Pseudorabdion
Snake genera
Taxa named by Giorgio Jan